Baladiyah al-Shumaisi, also the Al-Shumaisi Sub-Municipality, is an urban baladiyah and one of 14 sub-municipalities of Riyadh, Saudi Arabia, which consists of 15 neighborhoods and districts, including ash-Shumaysi, Ulaysha, Umm Salim, al-Jarradiyah and Siyah and is responsible for their development, planning and maintenance.

Neighborhoods and districts 

 Al Rafiah
 Al-Hada
 Al-Sharqiyah
 Al-Nasiriyah
 Al-Siyah
 Al-Wisham
 Al-Namudhajiyah
 Al-Maazer
 Al-Mutamarat
 Al-Badiah
 Umm Salim
 Ash-Shumaysi
 Al-Jarradiyah
 Al-Fakhiriyah
 Al-Ulayshah

References 

Shumaisi